Qeshlaq-e Buzcheh-ye Sofla-e Yek (also Romanized as Qeshlāq-e Būzcheh-ye Soflá-e Yek) is a village in Aslan Duz Rural District, Aslan Duz District, Parsabad County, Ardabil Province, Iran. At the 2006 census, its population was 131, in 25 families.

References 

Towns and villages in Parsabad County